LaCosta Tucker (born December 12, 1951) is an American country music artist who recorded in the 1970s and 1980s as La Costa. The sister of country singer Tanya Tucker, LaCosta charted several singles of her own in the 1970s on the Billboard country singles charts, including the No. 3 "Get on My Love Train."

Biography
Born in Seminole, Texas, Tucker moved around frequently, as her father Beau Tucker was a construction worker. Tucker had two siblings, Donald, and younger sister, Tanya Tucker. Beau felt LaCosta had the talent to be a star, and Tucker won her first talent contest at age four. In between entering beauty pageants and talent shows, she performed with Tanya in a band called the Country Westerners. She graduated from Cochise College in Douglas, Arizona, and began working as a medical records technician as she sang in clubs and became Miss Country Music, Phoenix.

LaCosta met and married airline pilot Darrell Sorensen, who fathered her children and also managed her career. It was around this time that Tanya was becoming a country music star. LaCosta chose to move to Las Vegas, to be near her; in 1974, Beau Tucker helped LaCosta get a recording contract with Capitol Records. Going only by LaCosta, she soon had a hit record with "I Wanna Get To You," which landed at 25 on the country charts, followed by "Get on My Love Train" at number 3, and "He Took Me for a Ride" at number 10. She charted ten more singles for Capitol and recorded five albums for the label. In 1982 she moved to Elektra Records, and she charted with "Love Take It Easy On Me," under her full name of LaCosta Tucker.

In 1989 LaCosta toured with Tanya and by the 1990s was serving as president of Tanya's fan club. She raised two children, and for a time, made gourmet candy for sale on her sister's website.

Many of LaCosta Tucker's recordings are out of print, but a 2000 release, Sisters: An Anthology, contains some of her hits packaged together with Tanya's material.

Discography

Studio albums

Singles

References

1951 births
American women country singers
American country singer-songwriters
Living people
Capitol Records artists
People from Seminole, Texas
Singer-songwriters from Texas
Country musicians from Texas
21st-century American women